Tariq Ghazniwal is one of several spokespersons for the Islamic Emirate of Afghanistan. He has distributed statements to the media by email in response to the assault on Marjah, the death of Osama bin Laden, and Western intervention in Libya.

Education and life
He is fluent in Hindi and may have been educated in India.

See also
 Zabiullah Mujahid
 Abdul Qahar Balkhi

References

External links
 Islamic Emirate of Aghanistan - Voice of Jihad

Taliban spokespersons
Living people
Year of birth missing (living people)